Elachista rhomboidea is a moth of the family Elachistidae. It is found along the western coast of the Australian state of Western Australia.

The wingspan is about 11.3 mm. The forewings are pale grey, powdered with pale brownish grey-tipped scales. The hindwings and fringes are grey.

References

Moths described in 2011
rhomboidea
Moths of Australia